Zevenaar is a municipality and a city in the Gelderland province, in the eastern Netherlands near the border with Germany.

Population centres 
Angerlo
Babberich
Giesbeek
Lathum
Ooy
Oud-Zevenaar
Zevenaar

History
The earliest signs of human activity are remnants of a 700 BC settlement found near present-day Zevenaar. In 1049, Emperor Hendrik III donated a large amount of land to five warlords of which the leader was named Bartholomeus II of Sevenaer. They founded a castle to protect the old Roman settlements from the Germans.

In 1355 Sevenaer passed from the control of the county/Duchy of Guelders (to which the modern Dutch province of Gelderland refers) to the Duchy of Cleves (Cleveland).

In 1487, the duke of Cleves gave Sevenaer city rights. Sevenaer was an important strategic point – this border area between Gelderland and Cleveland, was the border between the regions that would, over the centuries, be controlled from different centers of power – the modern states of The Netherlands and Prussia (later, Germany). Some of the Castles and houses in Zevenaar have foundations dating back to the 14th century Huize Sevenaer.

When Sevenaer obtained city rights it had the monopoly on markets and on sale of bread and beer with the surrounding towns. Also the jurisdiction in Sevenaer was founded, the town government was charging taxes so that the town could build roads, railways and public buildings. For the 500 inhabitants that was a heavy tax. Because of the plundering by several armies there were not enough supplies and money to build anything. Also contagious diseases ensured much embarrassment. In that time not the citizens but some well-to-do families got the right to participation in policy and government. Sevenaer then experienced a prosperous period. 

In 1614 Sevenaer as part of the Duchy of Cleves fell under control of the Margraviate of Brandenburg which would eventually become part of Prussia. 

In 1793 the city had 900 inhabitants.

In 1816, Sevenaer became part of the Kingdom of the Netherlands. Two years later the old spelling of Sevenaer was changed to the current name: Zevenaar. The municipality then had 2564 inhabitants. The 19th century was a century of poverty, bad harvests, sicknesses and hunger. There was hardly trade and work. Many people lived by agriculture or from charity. In 1856, Zevenaar was connected to the European railroad system, which (just some decades later) led to the increase in workforce. 

In 1920, the cigarette factory Turmac came which insured much employment.

After the second World War, which caused a lot of damage, people started to rebuild and new residential areas arose around the old core. In the 1950s approximately 10,000 people lived in Zevenaar. By 2005, that number had more than doubled to 22,500 inhabitants. The municipality of Zevenaar consists of the following residential areas, which together have 31.840 inhabitants in January 2007.(source: CBS)

Notable residents

 Andreas Masius (1514-1573), Catholic priest, humanist and European scholar
 H. L. M. van Nispen van Sevenaer (1879-1958) politician, nobleman, Mayor of Laren and Blaricum and resistance fighter
 Karel de Nerée tot Babberich (1880-1909), symbolist artist
 Theo van de Klundert (born 1936 in Herwen en Aerdt) a Dutch economist and academic
 Thijs van Leer (born 1948) a Dutch musician, known for the band Focus.
 Jan van Aken (born 1961 in Herwen en Aerdt) a Dutch writer and academic 
 Jeroen van Veen (born 1969 in Herwen en Aerdt) a Dutch classical pianist and composer
 Linda Wagenmakers (born 1975), singer and voice actress 
 Esmée Denters (born 1988), female singer

Sport 

 Minie Brinkhoff (born 1952) a retired Dutch cyclist
 Erik Parlevliet (1964-2007), field hockey player, team bronze medallist at the 1988 Summer Olympics
 Phillip Cocu (born 1970) professional football manager with SBV Vitesse and former player with 598 club caps
 Servais Knaven (born 1971 in Lobith) a Dutch professional road bicycle racer, competed at the 1992 and 2004 Summer Olympics
 Danny Heister (born 1971) professional table tennis player
 Nick Oudendag (born 1987) professional basketball player
 Wesley Koolhof (born 1989) tennis player

Image gallery

See also
Veldhuizen, Gelderland

References

External links

 
Municipalities of Gelderland
Populated places in Gelderland
Cities in the Netherlands